The Whitlock Avenue Historic District in Marietta, Georgia, is an  historic district that was listed on the National Register of Historic Places in 1989.  The listing included 101 contributing buildings.

It includes Greek Revival from antebellum times and various styles up to the 1930s.  The more important works include the Reid House, at 96 Whitlock Avenue, designed by Neel Reid (1885–1926) and the Maxwell House, at 134 McDonald Street, designed by G.L. Norrman.

It includes Italianate architecture from the later 1800s. It includes Late Victorian architecture including Queen Anne.

It includes Late 19th and 20th Century Revivals, including Classical Revival and Dutch Colonial.

It includes Bungalow/Craftsman architecture.

See also
Northwest Marietta Historic District (connection is noted in National Register NRIS database)

References

Greek Revival architecture in Georgia (U.S. state)
Victorian architecture in Georgia (U.S. state)
Geography of Cobb County, Georgia
Historic districts on the National Register of Historic Places in Georgia (U.S. state)
National Register of Historic Places in Cobb County, Georgia